Jan Stefan Mogren (born 27 May 1968) is a Swedish former football defender. He represented the Sweden national B team once.

References

1968 births
Living people
Swedish footballers
Västerås SK Fotboll players
Örebro SK players
BK Forward players
IK Oddevold players
IF Elfsborg players
FK Haugesund players
Association football defenders
Swedish expatriate footballers
Expatriate footballers in Norway
Swedish expatriate sportspeople in Norway
Allsvenskan players
Eliteserien players
Norwegian First Division players